Leif Svanström, 1943-2023, was a Swedish doctor and a specialist in Social medicine.

Beginning from 2010 Svanström was professor emeritus in Social Medicine at Karolinska Institute in Stockholm where he worked since 1980. He is the former prefect for the department of Public Health Sciences at Karolinska Institute and the former leader of the scientist group of accident prevention and work in safety promotion. Professor Svanström devoted about forty-five years of his life to the Social Medicine and Health and Safety Promotion. He has been researching and teaching in Injury Epidemiology and Safety Promotion. In the 1960s, he studied a number of descriptive and analytical works, and beginning from the 1970s he is engaged in home and occupational injuries. In 1974, he introduced "the community approach to safety promotion, encapsulated in the Falköping Model", which made a great influence at Swedish and international community safety work.
Leif has been doing policy development and is described as the founder of the Safe Community movement. He is the leader of International Safe Community Certifying Centre – a NGO for injury prevention and certifyer of municipalities at a global level. Under his leadership of the Research Group on Injury Prevention and Safety Promotion at the Karolinska Institutet in Stockholm, Sweden, more than 30 doctorates have been awarded.

Leif Svanström organized the first world conference in accident and injury prevention in Stockholm in 1989 and has since been a member of the organizational committee for the following nine conferences.

Leif Svanström was nominated to the Nobel Peace Prize in 2015.

Leif Svanström is a guest professor at Shandung University, Jinan, China and Ajou University, Suwon South Korea and also nominated for the same position at the University in Skopje, Macedonia. Svanström is the author of nearly 1200 articles and many educational books in social medicine, epidemiology and safety promotion work.

Books
 En introduktion till folkhälsovetenskap (2012). Published by HÄFTAD.
 Sjukdomslära (2003). Published by: KARTONNAGE.
 Att mäta folkhälsa (2017). Published by: Studentlitterture.

References

Karolinska Institutet – Department of Public Health Sciences
Karolinska Institutet – Research Group on Safety Promotion and Injury Prevention – Group Members
3rd Nordic Health Promotion Research Conference – Speakers

1943 births
Swedish public health doctors